West Phoenix High School is a public charter high school in Phoenix, Arizona. It is operated by The Leona Group and was one of its first Arizona schools to open.

For athletics, it is a member of the Canyon Athletic Association (CAA).

Public high schools in Arizona
The Leona Group
High schools in Phoenix, Arizona
Charter schools in Arizona